George Clifford Maxwell (March 16, 1768 – May 26, 1835) was a U.S. representative from New Jersey, father of John Patterson Bryan Maxwell. Maxwell's nephew George M. Robeson was United States Secretary of the Navy and also sat in Congress.

Biography
Born in Sussex County, New Jersey, Maxwell graduated from Princeton College in 1792. He studied law, was admitted to the bar in 1797 and practiced in Hunterdon County, New Jersey. He was U.S. Attorney for the District of New Jersey from 1801 to 1803.

Maxwell was elected as a Democratic-Republican to the Twelfth Congress (March 4, 1811 – March 3, 1813). He resumed the practice of law in Flemington, New Jersey, where he died on March 16, 1816. He was buried in Pleasant Ridge Cemetery in Raritan Township, New Jersey.

References

1771 births
1816 deaths
New Jersey lawyers
People from Sussex County, New Jersey
Princeton University alumni
People from Flemington, New Jersey
United States Attorneys for the District of New Jersey
Democratic-Republican Party members of the United States House of Representatives from New Jersey
19th-century American lawyers
People of colonial New Jersey
Burials in New Jersey